Malecón Lighthouse (also known simply as "El Faro") is a defunct lighthouse along the Malecón in Centro, Puerto Vallarta, in the Mexican state of Jalisco.

References

External links

 

1932 establishments in Mexico
1970 disestablishments in Mexico
Buildings and structures completed in 1932
Centro, Puerto Vallarta
Lighthouses in Mexico
Tourist attractions in Mexico
Buildings and structures in Puerto Vallarta